Ventura López (born 1909) was a Cuban former pitcher who played in the Negro leagues in the 1920s. 
A native of Havana, Cuba, López played for the Cuban Stars (West) in 1929. In 12 recorded games on the mound, he posted a 6.47 ERA over 55.2 innings.

References

External links
 and Seamheads

1909 births
Year of death missing
Date of birth missing
Cuban Stars (West) players
Baseball pitchers
Baseball players from Havana